Ruth Hall is a British activist who was a founding member of the group Women Against Rape.

In the late 1970s, Hall regularly staged protests at what she thought were lenient sentences for rapists. In 1983, she threatened any MPs in the British Parliament who blocked a bill to outlaw marital rape, saying "It takes only the objection of one MP to block a bill.  We will be taking note of any MP who blocks it and making sure they live to regret it."

References

British human rights activists
Women human rights activists
20th-century births
Living people
Year of birth missing (living people)